Dorn's Flour and Grist Mill is a historic grist mill located at McCormick in McCormick County, South Carolina.  It was built circa 1898 and is a 2 1/2- story, red brick structure with projecting one-story wings. A three-story brick wall of cross-shaped plan was built in 1915 to support a water tower tank. The mill originally housed a cotton gin.  In the 1920s, grist mill equipment was added. The mill closed in the 1940s.

It was listed on the National Register of Historic Places in 1976.

References

Grinding mills on the National Register of Historic Places in South Carolina
Industrial buildings completed in 1898
Buildings and structures in McCormick County, South Carolina
National Register of Historic Places in McCormick County, South Carolina
Grinding mills in South Carolina